Okanagana tristis is a species of cicada in the family Cicadidae. It is found in North America.

Subspecies
These two subspecies belong to the species Okanagana tristis:
 Okanagana tristis rubrobasalis Davis, 1926
 Okanagana tristis tristis Van Duzee, 1915

References

Further reading

 

Articles created by Qbugbot
Insects described in 1915
Okanagana